The Labette Formation is a geologic formation in Iowa, United States. It preserves fossils dating back to the Carboniferous period.

See also

 List of fossiliferous stratigraphic units in Iowa
 Paleontology in Iowa

References
 

Geologic formations of Iowa
Carboniferous System of North America
Carboniferous southern paleotropical deposits